Xiaohua Jia  received his BSc (1984) and MEng
(1987) from University of Science and Technology of China, and DSc (1991) in
Information Science from University of Tokyo. He is currently Chair Professor with
Dept of Computer Science at City University of Hong Kong. His research interests
include cloud computing and distributed systems, data security and privacy, computer
networks and mobile computing. Prof. Jia is an editor of IEEE Internet of Things,
IEEE Trans. on Parallel and Distributed Systems (2006-2009), Wireless Networks,
Journal of World Wide Web, Journal of Combinatorial Optimization, etc. He is the
General Chair of ACM MobiHoc 2008, TPC Co-Chair of IEEE GlobeCom 2010 – Ad
Hoc and Sensor Networking Symposium, Area-Chair of IEEE INFOCOM 2015-2017,
Track-Chair of IEEE ICDCS 2019, and General Chair of ACM ICN 2019. He is
Fellow of IEEE  and Distinguished Member of ACM.

References 

Fellow Members of the IEEE
Living people
Academic staff of the City University of Hong Kong
Hong Kong engineers
Year of birth missing (living people)